Stoll Keenon Ogden PLLC (SKO) is a law firm with five offices in Kentucky and Indiana. Founded in 1897, SKO is one of the oldest and largest law firms in the region.

As of 2022, SKO employs almost 200 attorneys, representing business clients and individuals on local, state, national and international levels.

In 2019, SKO was listed on the U.S. News-Best Lawyers® “Best Law Firms” list. The firm's attorneys have been recognized by Martindale-Hubbell®, Best Lawyers in America® and Benchmark Litigation.

History

Early origins 
Stoll Keenon Ogden traces its founding to 1897 in Lexington, Kentucky, by Yale Law School graduate, Richard Stoll.

In 1898, Stoll was appointed to the University of Kentucky Board of Trustees. He was re-appointed consecutively by seven governors and served on the board for 47 years. During his tenure at the university, Stoll was appointed Fayette Circuit Court Judge for the 22nd Judicial District in 1921. By 1928, Judge Stoll was elected president of the Circuit Judges of Kentucky, and he served until his resignation from the bench in 1931.

1930-1947 
In 1930, Judge Stoll and three lawyers — Wallace Muir, William H. Townsend and James Park—formed a law firm as a “continuous entity” in Lexington. Stoll, Muir, Townsend & Park was located on the sixth floor of the First National Bank & Trust Company building at the corner of Cheapside and Main.

Gayle Mohney joined the firm in 1931, following his graduation from the University of Kentucky College of Law. During his undergraduate years at UK, Mohney was the quarterback of the football team, and is known for drop-kicking a field goal that resulted in a victory over the University of Tennessee as the game-ending horn sounded.

During his 49-year professional career, Mohney established a national reputation as an expert lawyer in the thoroughbred industry. In 1935, along with Hal Price Headley, he developed a syndication agreement and plan to form the Keeneland Association as “a thoroughbred breeders” racetrack and sales company. Today, the Keeneland Association is the world's leading thoroughbred auction company, and SKO continues to enjoy its longstanding reputation as Keeneland's legal counsel.

1948-2005 
In 1948, Stoll, Muir, Townsend & Park merged with Keenon, Huguelet and Odear and adopted the name Stoll, Keenon & Park. Rodman Keenon, a trial lawyer and former state senator from Fayette County, had previously served as clerk of the Kentucky Court of Appeals.

To more sharply define the firm's operations, William M. Lear Jr. was appointed the firm's first Managing Partner in 1985. His duties included organizing the practice of the firm through a committee system and providing periodic reports to the firm's attorneys.

2006-2011 
In January 2006, Stoll, Keenon & Park merged with Louisville-based Ogden Newell & Welch, forming Stoll Keenon Ogden PLLC.

In 2010, the firm established the James Welch Sr. Arts Leadership Award, in conjunction with the Fund for the Arts, which annually recognizes distinguished individuals whose leadership has made a lasting impact in the Louisville arts community.

In 2011, the firm continued its involvement in horse racing by sponsoring the oldest thoroughbred horse race in North America—the Phoenix Stakes —which first ran in 1831. Today, the Stoll Keenon Ogden Phoenix Stakes now runs on opening day of Keeneland's fall meet.

2012-2019 
In 2016, P. Douglas Barr replaced William Lear as managing director of the firm. Barr became the fourth person in the firm's history to manage operations and strategic direction.

In 2017, Stoll Keenon Ogden merged with Indiana-based Bamberger, Foreman, Oswald & Hahn, with the goal of broadening and diversifying the firm's practice in Indianapolis and Evansville. The merged firm operates as Stoll Keenon Ogden, PLLC.

Stoll Keenon Ogden continues its service to clients over decades, notably those in banking, public utilities, energy, natural gas, coal, beverage alcohol, manufacturing and equine industries.

2022-Present 
July 1, 2022, Stoll Keenon Ogden merged with the renowned Indianapolis firm of Katz Korin Cunningham PC.  The merged firm continues to operate as Stoll Keenon Ogden, or colloquially, as "SKO."  SKO's Indianapolis location is now headquartered in the Historic Emelie Building at 334 North Senate Avenue, Indianapolis Indiana, which had been the home of Katz Korin Cunningham for decades prior to the merger.

Growth 
1930 – Judge Stoll, Wallace Muir, William H. Townsend and James Park form a law firm known as a “continuous entity” in Lexington, known as Stoll, Muir, Townsend & Park.

1948 – The firm merges with Keenon, Huguelet and Odear and adopts the name Stoll, Keenon & Park.

1982 – Stoll, Keenon & Park acquires the Frankfort-based firm Johnson & Judy.

1993 – Stoll, Keenon & Park opens a Louisville office with Samuel D. Hinkle IV and Lea Pauley Goff, both of whom are still with the firm.

1998 – Firm expands in western Kentucky, acquiring Sheffer Hoffman in Henderson.

2006 – Stoll, Keenon & Park merges with Ogden Newell & Welch, forming Stoll Keenon Ogden PLLC.

2017 – Stoll Keenon Ogden PLLC merges with Indiana-based Bamberger, Foreman, Oswald & Hahn, adding 10 attorneys to the firm's Evansville team and an office in Indianapolis with five attorneys.

2022– Stoll Keenon Ogden PLLC merges with Indianapolis-based Katz Korin Cunningham, PC, adding approximately 40 attorneys to the firm.

Practice Areas 
SKO attorneys provide legal counsel to clients in Commercial Litigation, Transactional Law, Labor & Employment Law and Utility & Regulatory Law, with more than 40 practice areas, including Bankruptcy & Financial Restructuring, Equine Law, Securities & Corporate Governance, Trusts & Estates, Real Estate, Intellectual Property, and Labor, Employment & Employee Benefits.

Offices 
Frankfort, Kentucky 
Hodgenville, Kentucky 
Lexington, Kentucky 
Louisville, Kentucky 
Indianapolis, Indiana 
Evansville, Indiana

Notable lawyers and alumni 
Allison Lundergan Grimes, Secretary of State of Kentucky
Laurance B. VanMeter, Associate Justice of the Kentucky Supreme Court
David W. Tandy, former Louisville Metro Council member

References

External links
Official Website
Best Lawyers Profile
Oakwood Legal Group
Martindale-Hubble Profile

Law firms based in Kentucky